Crepidium tjiwideiense is a species of the family Orchidaceae endemic to the Philippines.

References

tjiwideiense
Orchids of the Philippines